Federica D'Astolfo (born 27 October 1966) is an Italian football coach and former midfielder. She played for Italy at the 1991 and 1999 editions of the FIFA Women's World Cup. Active at club level from 1978 to 2006, she won five women's Serie A winner's medals and one Coppa Italia winner's medal.

International career
D'Astolfo won her first cap for the Italy women's national football team on 2 April 1988, starting a 0–0 1989 European Competition for Women's Football qualifying draw with West Germany in Andria. 

At the 1991 FIFA Women's World Cup, D'Astolfo was ever-present as Italy reached the quarter-final and lost 3–2 to Norway after extra time. At UEFA Women's Euro 1993 hosts Italy reached the final and suffered another defeat by Norway, 1–0 this time.

Honours

Club 
Lazio
 Serie A (2): 1986–87, 1987–88

Modena
 Serie A (2): 1996–97, 1997–98
 Italian Women's Super Cup (1): 1997

Foroni Verona
 Serie A (1): 2002–03
 Coppa Italia (1): 2001–02
 Italian Women's Super Cup (1): 2002

International 
Italy
 UEFA Women's Championship Runner-up: 1993

References

External links
FIFA profile

1966 births
Living people
Italian women's footballers
Italy women's international footballers
1991 FIFA Women's World Cup players
1999 FIFA Women's World Cup players
Women's association football midfielders
Serie A (women's football) managers
ACF Milan 82 players
S.S. Lazio Women 2015 players
Foroni Verona F.C. players
A.S.D. Reggiana Calcio Femminile players
ASD Fiammamonza 1970 players
Serie A (women's football) players